Malanje Airport  is an airport serving Malanje, the capital of Malanje Province in Angola.

See also
 List of airports in Angola
 Transport in Angola

References

External links
 
 OpenStreetMap - Malanje

Airports in Angola